The 1991 BMW Open Singles was the singles bracket of the 1991 BMW Open.  The title was won by Magnus Gustafsson, defeating Guillermo Pérez Roldán.  Roldán retired while Gustafsson was leading 3–6, 6–3, 4–3.  Karel Nováček, the defending champion from the prior year singles event, did not participate.

Seeds

  Ivan Lendl (semifinals)
  Goran Ivanišević (semifinals)
  Jonas Svensson (first round)
  John McEnroe (first round)
  Thomas Muster (first round)
  Michael Stich (first round)
  Guillermo Pérez Roldán (final)
  Alexander Volkov (first round)

Draw

Finals

Top half

Bottom half

External links
 Singles draw

Singles